Southampton Township is a township in Bedford County, Pennsylvania, United States. The population was 839 at the 2020 census.

History
The Hewitt Covered Bridge was listed on the National Register of Historic Places in 1980.

Geography
Southampton Township is located in southern Bedford County, with the Maryland state line forming its southern boundary. It is bordered by Evitts Mountain on the west and by the lower Big Mountain and Ragged Mountain on the east. Tussey Mountain rises in the middle of the township. Buchanan State Forest occupies the high ground on Evitts and Tussey Mountains and some other areas.

Adjacent municipalities
Cumberland Valley Township (west)
Colerain Township (north)
Monroe Township (northeast)
Mann Township (east)
Allegany County, Maryland (south)

Demographics

As of the census of 2000, there were 1,010 people, 376 households and 295 families residing in the township. The population density was 12.6 per square mile (4.9/km2). There were 526 housing units at an average density of 6.6/sq mi (2.5/km2). The racial makeup was 99.21% White, 0.20% African American, 0.30% Native American, 0.10% Asian, 0.10% from other races, and 0.10% from two or more races. Hispanic or Latino of any race were 0.50% of the population.

There were 376 households, out of which 35.1% had children under the age of 18 living with them, 72.1% were married couples living together, 4.0% had a female householder with no husband present, and 21.5% were non-families. 17.6% of all households were made up of individuals, and 9.3% had someone living alone who was 65 years of age or older. The average household size was 2.69 and the average family size was 3.04.

In the township the population was spread out, with 24.9% under the age of 18, 6.5% from 18 to 24, 30.8% from 25 to 44, 23.7% from 45 to 64, and 14.2% who were 65 years of age or older. The median age was 38 years. For every 100 females there were 107.0 males. For every 100 females age 18 and over, there were 106.3 males.

The median income for a household in the township was $34,524, and the median income for a family was $36,667. Males had a median income of $26,750 versus $17,381 for females. The per capita income was $15,271. About 3.8% of families and 7.9% of the population were below the poverty line, including 13.3% of those under age 18 and 7.7% of those age 65 or over.

References

Populated places established in 1776
Townships in Bedford County, Pennsylvania